The term Greek legislative election, 1989 may refer to:

Greek legislative election, June 1989 
Greek legislative election, November 1989